The 2020 Alsco 300 was a NASCAR Xfinity Series race held on September 26, 2020. It was contested over 200 laps on the  tri-oval. It was the twenty-seventh race of the 2020 NASCAR Xfinity Series season, and the first race of the playoffs, as well as the Round of 12. Stewart-Haas Racing driver Chase Briscoe collected his eighth win of the season.

Report

Background 
Las Vegas Motor Speedway, located in Clark County, Nevada outside the Las Vegas city limits and about 15 miles northeast of the Las Vegas Strip, is a  complex of multiple tracks for motorsports racing. The complex is owned by Speedway Motorsports, Inc., which is headquartered in Charlotte, North Carolina.

Entry list 

 (R) denotes rookie driver.
 (i) denotes driver who is ineligible for series driver points.

Qualifying 
Chase Briscoe was awarded the pole based on competition based formula.

Qualifying results

Race

Race results

Stage Results 
Stage One
Laps: 45

Stage Two
Laps: 45

Final Stage Results 

Laps: 110

Race statistics 

 Lead changes: 8 among 5 different drivers
 Cautions/Laps: 6 for 28
 Time of race: 2 hours, 20 minutes, and 51 seconds
 Average speed:

References 

NASCAR races at Las Vegas Motor Speedway
2020 in sports in Nevada
Alsco 300
2020 NASCAR Xfinity Series